Tom Gale may refer to:

Tom Gale (designer) (born 1943), American automobile designer
Tom Gale (footballer) (1912–1986), Australian rules footballer
Tom Gale (high jumper) (born 1998), English high jumper